Rinat Matatov (born 6 August 1981) is an Israeli actress. Winner of the Theatre Academy Award. Matatov was born in Kokand, Uzbekistan, to a father who worked as an engineer and a mother who worked as a nurse. In 1990, the Matatov family immigrated to Israel and has been living in the center of the country ever since. Matatov first studied acting as a theatre major at the Herzog Regional High School for Science, Arts and the Humanities. After she graduated, she joined the army as a member of a Nachal (pioneer combatant youth) group, and after her release from the army, she started her professional acting studies at the Performing Arts Studio of Yoram Leowenstein. Right after graduating, Matatov received her first role in the film Someone to Run With based on David Grossman’s book.

Matatov was announced "Promising Actress" for 2009 in the Israeli theatre awards ceremony for her role in the play Crazy at Habima theatre.

Matatov won the 2011 Children and Youth Stage Award as the best supporting actress of the year for her role in the play Good Girl at The Hour theatre.

Matatov won the 2012 Haifa Festival’s Best Actress Award for her part role in the play Sorrowful Song at The Hour theatre.

Theatre

Filmography

Films

Series

Awards 
 2013 - "Best Actress" award at the Haifa International Children’s Theatre Festival
 2012 - "Best Supporting Actress" award at the Stage Award for Children and Youth
 2009 - "Promising Actress" award at the Israel Theatre Award Ceremony 
 2008 -  Candidate for the Ophir Award as a supporting actress in the film "The Band’s Visit" 
 2007 – Candidate for the Ophir Award as a supporting actress in the film "Someone to Run With"

References

External links 
 

Israeli film actresses
Israeli stage actresses
21st-century Israeli actresses
1981 births
Living people
People from Kokand